Sclerolaena lanicuspis, the spinach-burr or copper-burr, is a species of flowering plant in the family Amaranthaceae, native to Australia (except Tasmania). A woody perennial reaching , it has tomentose branches and semiterete leaves.

References

lanicuspis
Endemic flora of Australia
Taxa named by Ferdinand von Mueller
Plants described in 1870